Intestinal metabolic bromhidrosis syndrome (IMBS) is a disorder, that is characterized by bromhidrosis and halitosis symptoms that are caused by odorous intestinal metabolites passing through the intestinal wall and by the liver to be excreted by skin glands and the lung gas exchange.

Patients with those symptoms show chronic body odor and bad breath despite a completely normal or even higher hygienic standard.

Recent intestinal metabolic research 
Bromhidrosis is regularly viewed as a classical dermatological disorder, but recent medical research is more and more putting focus on the intestinal metabolism as a source of bromhidrosis symptoms.

Types of chronic body or halitosis odors 
IMBS as a syndrome is wrapping several specific subsets of body and/or halitosis odors to be present as a symptom:
 Fecal like body odor (indole, skatole)
 Sweat like body odor (carboxylates)
 Sweaty feat like body odor (isovalerate)
 Vomit like body odor (butyrate)
 Urine like body odor (ammonia)
 Rotten eggs like body odor (sulfides)
 Rotten fish like body odor (trimethylamine)
 Rotten meat like body odor (putrescine)
 Cabbage like body odor (methanethiol)

In patients a single but also any combination of different body odor or halitosis smells might be present. Additionally those symptoms can vary based on different dietary choices over time.

Underlying diseases 
IMBS as a syndrome can be caused by various (mostly rare) diseases.

At the moment following diseases are already defined and known to cause Bromhidrosis symptoms:
 Trimethylaminuria
 Dimethyglycineuria
 Defects in SELENBP1 gene which leads to accumulation of methanethiol and a cabbage like body odor and halitosis

As intestinal research progresses, it is expected that further diseases emerge that are able to explain the occurrence of all the observed types of body odor.and halitosis types and their corresponding intestinal metabolites.

Correlation with irritable bowel syndrome (IBS) 
Newer studies on the field of IBS research showed e.g. elevated dimethylglycine levels in urine samples of patient subgroups. Elevated dimethylglycine levels in urine samples are known to also correlate with fish odor symptoms

References

External links 
 Official IMBS patient organization website

Diseases of intestines